C. H. Mohammed Koya ministry, from 12 October to 01 December, 1979, 4th ministry from the 5th Kerala Legislative Assembly, was a coalition government headed Indian Union Muslim League leader C. H. Mohammed Koya and supported by Congress leader K. Karunakaran. Koya was the first Indian Union Muslim League member to lead a state in independent India.

Gift Deeds Bill, an amendment to the Kerala Land Reforms Act, was passed by the Koya ministry. It validated gifts from owners with surplus land to their children or children of deceased children executed between 01 January 1, 1970 and 05 November, 1974. The amendment reduced the redistributive potential of the Kerala land ceiling legislations.

The ministry was formed after the resignation of the P. K. Vasudevan Nair ministry in October, 1979. The coalition was supported by Kerala Congress K. M. Mani Group and P. J. Joseph Group. Kerala Congress K. M. Mani Group withdrew its support for the coalition in mid-November, 1979. When the Congress A. K. Antony Group withdrew its support for the coalition, Koya lost his Legislative Assembly majority, and resigned in December, 1979. The Koya ministry lasted 1 month and 20 days. 

After a brief President's Rule, it was succeeded by the first E. K. Nayanar ministry (25 January, 1980).

References 

Kerala ministries
1979 establishments in Kerala
1979 disestablishments in India
Cabinets established in 1979
Cabinets disestablished in 1979